Gábor Gerő (28 February 1909 – 1977) was a Hungarian sprinter. He competed in the men's 100 metres at the 1936 Summer Olympics.

References

1909 births
1977 deaths
Athletes (track and field) at the 1936 Summer Olympics
Hungarian male sprinters
Olympic athletes of Hungary
Place of birth missing